Judy Baar Topinka (January 16, 1944 – December 10, 2014) was an American politician and member of the Republican Party from the U.S. State of Illinois.

Originally a journalist, Topinka served in the Illinois House of Representatives from 1981 to 1985 and in the Illinois Senate from 1985 to 1995. She was elected to three terms as Illinois State Treasurer, serving from 1995 to 2007. She was the first woman to become state treasurer, the first to be elected to three consecutive terms, and the first Republican to hold the post in more than 32 years. During her last term as treasurer, she was the only Republican to hold statewide elected office in Illinois. In 2002, she was elected chair of the Illinois Republican Party, holding that office until 2005.

She declined to run for re-election as treasurer in 2006, instead running for Governor of Illinois. In March 2006, she was nominated as the Republican candidate. She was the second woman (after 1994 Democratic nominee Dawn Clark Netsch) and first Republican woman to be nominated for governor of Illinois. She lost the election to Democratic incumbent Rod Blagojevich.

In 2010, she successfully ran for the office of Illinois Comptroller. She was re-elected to a second four-year term in November 2014, but died of a stroke only a month later.

Early years
Topinka was born in the Chicago, Illinois, suburb of Riverside to Lillian Mary (Shuss) and William D. Baar, the children of Czech and Slovak immigrants. After graduating from Ferry Hall School in Lake Forest in 1962, she attended Northwestern University in nearby Evanston. Topinka received a Bachelor of Science degree in journalism from the university's Medill School of Journalism. She was a member of the Alpha Gamma Delta sorority.

Journalism and public relations careers
After graduating from Northwestern, Topinka became a reporter for several suburban Chicago newspapers, eventually becoming an editor. On the side, Topinka established her own public relations business, through which she began a career in consulting for various political candidates.

Political career

Legislative career
In 1980, Topinka first pursued her own career in politics by running for the Illinois General Assembly. She won a seat in the Illinois House of Representatives and served two two-year terms, respectively for the 7th and 43rd districts. In 1984, she set her sights on the upper house of the Illinois General Assembly and won a seat in the Illinois Senate where she represented the 22nd district for ten years.

Illinois State Treasurer

In the middle of a term as state senator, Topinka joined the Illinois State Treasurer race in 1994 and won the election. She was reelected in 1998 and 2002.

As state treasurer, Topinka cut a deal to allow hotels that were owned by indicted Springfield power-broker Bill Cellini to pay $10 million to settle their debts which totaled $40.3 million. This deal was quashed by Attorney General Jim Ryan who stated that the hotels were worth more than the $10 million for which Topinka had attempted to settle the debt.

Illinois gubernatorial campaign

On November 7, 2005, Topinka announced that she would not seek re-election as state treasurer—instead, she entered the gubernatorial primary, hoping to challenge Democratic Governor Rod Blagojevich. The Republican primary was deeply divisive; her tenure as Party chairman destroyed her support from the conservative wing of her party, and it was feared that her pro-choice and positive gay rights positions would be detrimental to her standing with the same conservatives. In December she announced that she would join forces with DuPage County State's Attorney Joe Birkett as a candidate for Lieutenant Governor of Illinois.

In February 2006, the candidates for the Republican nomination for Illinois Governor began running their first TV ads for the March statewide primary election. Rival candidate Ron Gidwitz's advertisements, attacking Topinka, were rebuked in the same week by the Illinois Republican Party: "In an unprecedented action, the Illinois Republican Party has officially rebuked the Gidwitz campaign for this ad because the Party found that the ad violates the Party's "Code of Conduct," which was enacted to police proper conduct among Republican candidates."

Later in February, candidate Jim Oberweis, another rival for the Republican gubernatorial nomination, started a series of attack ads against Topinka for television markets that were even more widely criticized, mostly for using "fake" headlines on the images of actual Illinois newspapers. These ads, like Gidwitz's ads, also came under review by the Illinois Republican Party. Because of the controversy generated, several television stations withdrew Oberweis's ads.

On March 21, 2006, Topinka won the Republican nomination with 37 percent of the vote.

On November 7, 2006, she lost the race to Blagojevich.

Illinois Comptroller

Topinka was a candidate for the office of Illinois State Comptroller in the 2010 election, facing conservative radio host William J. Kelly and Orland Park Village Trustee Jim Dodge in the Republican primary. She won the nomination with 59% of the vote. She went on to win the general election against Illinois state representative David E. Miller (D), Julie Fox (L) and E. Erika Schafer (G). She won re-election in November 2014.

Electoral history
 2014 election for Illinois State Comptroller
 Judy Baar Topinka (R) (inc.), 50%
 Sheila Simon (D), 46%
 Julie Fox (L), 5%
 2010 election for Illinois State Comptroller
 Judy Baar Topinka (R), 53% 
 David Miller (D), 41% 
 Julie Fox (L), 3% 
 R. Erika Schafer (G), 3%
 2006 election for Governor of Illinois
 Rod Blagojevich (D) (inc.), 50%
 Judy Baar Topinka (R), 39%
 Rich Whitney (Green), 10%
 2002 election for Illinois State Treasurer
 Judy Baar Topinka (Republican) (inc.), 55%
 Tom Dart (Democrat), 43%
 1998 election for Illinois State Treasurer
 Judy Baar Topinka (Republican) (inc.), 50%
 Dan McLaughlin (Democrat), 48%
 1994 election for Illinois State Treasurer
 Judy Baar Topinka (Republican), 51%
 Nancy Shaheen (Democrat), 49%

Personal life and death
In 1965, she married Joe Topinka. They had a son, Joseph, before divorcing in 1981.

Topinka was a member of the Illinois St. Andrew Society and attended multiple events for it throughout the year. She could play four instruments and could fluently speak four languages, English, Czech, Spanish and Polish.

On December 9, 2014, Topinka was admitted to MacNeal Hospital in Berwyn, a western suburb of Chicago, after reporting discomfort. After undergoing tests, she appeared to be doing well. However, overnight she suddenly lost consciousness and was pronounced dead from a stroke at shortly after 2 a.m. on December 10. President Barack Obama referred to Topinka as "an institution in Illinois politics", citing her service in a statement from the White House. Illinois Governor Pat Quinn said it was a "sad day in the state of Illinois", calling her "a trailblazer in every sense of the word". Topinka was succeeded by Jerry Stermer as comptroller.

See also
 Political party strength in Illinois

References

Notes

External links
 Official campaign website
 
 
 State of Illinois Comptroller

|-

|-

|-

|-

|-

1944 births
2014 deaths
American people of Czech descent
American people of Slovak descent
Comptrollers of Illinois
Illinois Republican Party chairs
Republican Party Illinois state senators
Medill School of Journalism alumni
Republican Party members of the Illinois House of Representatives
People from Riverside, Illinois
State treasurers of Illinois
Women state legislators in Illinois
20th-century American politicians
20th-century American women politicians
21st-century American politicians
21st-century American women politicians
Candidates in the 1994 United States elections
Inductees of the Chicago LGBT Hall of Fame